Richard Owen (1804–1892) was an English biologist, comparative anatomist and palaeontologist.

Richard Owen is also the name of:

 Richard Owen (geologist) (1810–1890), Scottish-born American geologist, American Civil War officer, Indiana University professor, Purdue University president
 Bust of Richard Owen
 Richard Owen (minister) (1839–1887), Welsh Calvinistic minister
 Richard Owen (judge) (1922–2015), American composer and federal judge for the United States District Court for the Southern District of New York
 Richard Owen (rugby league) (born 1990), rugby league player for the Castleford Tigers
 Richard Owen (priest) (1899–1977), Archdeacon of St Asaph, 1964–1970

See also 
 Richard Owens (disambiguation)